Lucy Mason is a politician from Arizona. Mason served for 8 years in the Arizona State House of Representatives.

Mason was educated at Arizona State University, the University of Houston, Northern Arizona University and the University of Arizona.

Mason began her political career as a member of the Prescott City Council. She served for eight years in the Arizona State legislature, four of them as chair of the State House energy committee. She ran for the Arizona Corporation Commission in 2014. The Arizona Solar Energy Industries Association (AriSEIA) Board of Directors is pleased to announce it has hired former Republican State Representative Lucy Mason as its Executive Director November 2014.

Mason is a Latter-day Saint.

References

External links
 Campaign bio for Mason
 Arizona legislature bio of Mason
 Vote Smart bio
 Arizona Republic article that mentions Mason's stance on immigration issues
 AriSEIA Names Former Republican State Representative Lucy Mason As Executive Director

Living people
Arizona State University alumni
University of Houston alumni
Northern Arizona University alumni
University of Arizona alumni
Latter Day Saints from Arizona
Arizona city council members
Politicians from Prescott, Arizona
Women state legislators in Arizona
Women city councillors in Arizona
Year of birth missing (living people)
21st-century American women